is a railway station in Yamatotakada, Nara Prefecture, Japan.

Line
Kintetsu Railway
Minami Osaka Line

Layout
The station has  two side platforms and two tracks.

Adjacent stations

External links
 Ukiana Station (Kintetsu Corporation) (Japanese)

Railway stations in Japan opened in 1929
Railway stations in Nara Prefecture